Maarten Jan den Bakker (born 26 January 1969) is a retired road bicycle racer from the Netherlands, who was a professional rider from 1990 to 2008. He won the Dutch National Road Race Championships twice and he participated in nine Tours de France, completing each of them. In 2008, Den Bakker ended his career. He also competed in the team time trial at the 1988 Summer Olympics.

Career achievements

Major results

1989
 2nd Overall Olympia's Tour
1990
 5th Brussels–Ingooigem
1991
 5th Overall Tirreno–Adriatico
1993
 2nd Overall Tour de Luxembourg
1st Stage 4
 2nd Veenendaal–Veenendaal
1994
 1st Nationale Sluitingprijs
 2nd Overall Tour de l'Avenir
1st Stage 3
 2nd De Brabantse Pijl
 9th Overall Vuelta a Andalucía
 10th Giro di Lombardia
1995
 2nd Grand Prix de Wallonie
 2nd Overall Tour of Galicia
 3rd Road race, National Road Championships
 5th Züri Metzgete
 8th Overall Ronde van Nederland
 10th Liège–Bastogne–Liège
 10th De Brabantse Pijl
1996
 1st  Road race, National Road Championships
 1st Stage 5 Vuelta a Andalucía
 4th De Brabantse Pijl
 8th Overall Ronde van Nederland
1997
 2nd Brabantse Pijl
 4th GP Rik Van Steenbergen
 6th Overall Route du Sud
 7th GP de Suisse
1998
 3rd Paris–Bourges
 2nd Amstel Gold Race
 4th La Flèche Wallonne
 7th Rund um den Henninger Turm
 8th Overall GP Tell
1st Stage 2
 9th Liège–Bastogne–Liège
 10th Overall Ronde van Nederland
1999
 1st  Road race, National Road Championships
 2nd La Flèche Wallonne
 3rd Liège–Bastogne–Liège
 4th Amstel Gold Race
 6th Gran Premio Bruno Beghelli
 6th Delta Profronde
 6th Overall Paris–Nice
 8th Overall Ronde van Nederland
1st Stage 5
 8th Overall Three Days of Bruges–De Panne
 9th Dwars door Vlaanderen
2000
 3rd Time trial, National Road Championships
 5th Overall Three Days of Bruges–De Panne
 6th Rund um den Henninger Turm
 7th GP Ouest-France
 8th Liège–Bastogne–Liège
 10th Overall Guldensporentweedaagse
2001
 7th Omloop Het Volk
 8th Overall Ronde van Nederland
 10th Luk-Cup Bühl
2003
 1st  Time trial, National Road Championships
 1st Stage 4 UNIQA Classic
 5th Ronde van Midden-Zeeland
 6th Overall Tour of Belgium
 8th Tour Beneden-Maas
2004
 8th Kuurne–Brussels–Kuurne
2005
 4th Schaal Sels
2007
 1st Profronde van Fryslan
 3rd Road race, National Road Championships
 7th Nationale Sluitingprijs
 10th Overall Tour of Belgium
2008
 1st Stage 1b (TTT) Brixia Tour

Grand Tour general classification results timeline

See also
 List of Dutch Olympic cyclists

References

External links
Profile on Skil-Shimano official website
 

1969 births
Living people
Dutch male cyclists
People from Bernisse
Dutch cycling time trial champions
Cyclists from South Holland
Olympic cyclists of the Netherlands
Cyclists at the 1988 Summer Olympics